Giorgos Kyriakopoulos (born 5 February 1996) is a Greek professional footballer who plays as a left-back for Italian  club Bologna, on loan from Sassuolo. He represents the Greece national team.

Club career

Early career
Kyriakopoulos was born in Patras, Greece. As a child he played for Thyella Patras until 2011. At the age of 14, he moved to Asteras Tripolis and was a key member of the U17 and U20 teams of the club.

Asteras Tripolis
His first professional contract with Asteras Tripolis signed it in 2013. He played as on loan at the Football League with Ergotelis and Lamia.

Loan to Ergotelis
On 13 August 2015, Kyriakopoulos moved to Ergotelis as a loanee from Asteras Tripolis.

Loan to Lamia
On 26 January 2016, Kyriakopoulos moved to Lamia as a loanee from Asteras Tripolis.

Loan to Sassuolo
On 2 September 2019, Kyriakopoulos moved to Sassuolo as a loanee from Asteras Tripolis, for an initial loan fee of €200,000 with a purchase option of €1 million for the summer of 2020.

Sassuolo
On 22 June 2020, Sassuolo have officially exercised their option to purchase defender Georgios Kyriakopoulos from Asteras Tripolis. The 24-year-old left-back had arrived last summer on loan for €200,000 with an option to buy for a further €1.2 million. During his debut Serie A season, Kyriakopoulos has so far made 17 appearances in the Neroverdi jersey and he also contributed with three assists. On 23 May 2021, Kyriakopoulos scored his first goal in Serie A, with an amazing shot from 35 meters opening the score in the last matchday of 2020–21 season against Lazio, but he was sent off in the second half with a second yellow card. It was his first goal with the club in all competitions. On 16 January 2022, he gave two assists in a 4–2 home loss against Hellas Verona.

Loan to Bologna
On 31 January 2023, Kyriakopoulos moved on loan to Bologna, with an option to buy.

International career
He made his national team debut on 7 October 2020 in a friendly against Austria.

Career statistics

Club

References

External links

1996 births
Living people
Greek footballers
Footballers from Patras
Association football defenders
Greece international footballers
Greece under-21 international footballers
Greece youth international footballers
Super League Greece players
Football League (Greece) players
Serie A players
Asteras Tripolis F.C. players
Ergotelis F.C. players
PAS Lamia 1964 players
U.S. Sassuolo Calcio players
Bologna F.C. 1909 players
Greek expatriate footballers
Greek expatriate sportspeople in Italy
Expatriate footballers in Italy